Cycloprionus is a species of beetle in the family Cerambycidae. It is monotypic, being represented by the single species Cycloprionus flavus.

References

Prioninae